Marc Marco Ripoll (born 20 January 1981) is a Spanish photographer and former professional tennis player. He was a finalist in the Weather Photographer of the Year award for 2020.

Ripoll reached a career high singles ranking of 471 in the world, competing mostly in satellite and ITF Futures events. He made four ATP Tour main draw appearances as a doubles player. On debut at the 1999 Majorca Open he partnered with Feliciano Lopez and for his three other tournaments he teamed up with Carlos Moyá.

A former hitting partner of Sabine Lisicki, Ripoll now coaches tennis on the island of Majorca.

References

External links
 
 

1981 births
Living people
Spanish male tennis players
Spanish photographers